The 2012–13 Central Connecticut Blue Devils men's basketball team represented Central Connecticut State University during the 2012–13 NCAA Division I men's basketball season. The Blue Devils, led by 17th year head coach Howie Dickenman, played their home games at the William H. Detrick Gymnasium and were members of the Northeast Conference. They finished the season 13–17, 9–9 in NEC play to finish in seventh place. They lost in the quarterfinals of the Northeast Conference Basketball tournament to Wagner.

Roster

Schedule

|-
!colspan=9| Regular season

  
 
 

|-
!colspan=9| 2013 Northeast Conference men's basketball tournament

References

Central Connecticut Blue Devils men's basketball seasons
Central Connecticut
Central Connecticut Blue Devils men's basketball
Central Connecticut Blue Devils men's basketball